Outside Metro Detroit:
Croswell Opera House, Adrian (oldest theater in Michigan)
Calumet Theatre, Calumet
Grand Rapids Civic Theatre, Grand Rapids
Grant Fine Arts Center
Howard Performing Arts Center, Berrien Springs
Ironwood Theatre
Midland Center for the Arts
Tecumseh Center for the Arts, Tecumseh
Wharton Center for Performing Arts, East Lansing
Enter Stage Right at The Citadel Stage, Port Huron

Metro Detroit:
Arthur Miller Theatre, University of Michigan, Ann Arbor
Ford Community and Performing Arts Center, Dearborn
Hill Auditorium, University of Michigan, Ann Arbor
Lydia Mendelssohn Theatre, University of Michigan, Ann Arbor
Macomb Music Theatre
Michigan Theater (Ann Arbor)
McMorran Place, Port Huron
Players Guild of Dearborn, Dearborn
Power Center for the Performing Arts, University of Michigan, Ann Arbor
Rackham Auditorium, University of Michigan, Ann Arbor
Stagecrafters at The Baldwin Theatre, Royal Oak, MI
The Whiting (auditorium), Flint
Tipping Point Theatre, Northville

City of Detroit:

Michigan
Theaters